The Québec official soccer team is the official soccer team representing the Canadian province of Québec. The stated mission of the team is "...to allow Québec to be represented at the international level to share our language, our culture and heritage through soccer."  Originally, the team was not sanctioned by the Quebec Soccer Federation as the federation was suspended by the Canadian Soccer Association in June 2013 for not allowing players wearing turbans for religious reasons to participate in matches. However, the team communicated with the federation and regularly communicated the progress of the project to build a relationship in preparation for being sanctioned in the future. In May 2014, it was announced that the team had officially become associated with the QSF and were working together to perhaps eventually become a member of CONCACAF and play against other national teams. Québec is not a member of FIFA or any confederation or subconfederation as they are wholly a part of Canada. However, Québec is an official member of the Confederation of Independent Football Associations (ConIFA), a global umbrella organization for national football teams outside FIFA. Usually in Québec, the majority of the population speak French, while English is the largest minority.   Although the purpose of the team is said to be cultural, not political, the team is partially funded by the Saint-Jean-Baptiste Society and Parti Québécois, a Canadian political party that advocates the Québec sovereignty movement. The team was formed in 2013 and played its first match against a Tibet select team in the 2013 International Peoples, Cultures, and Tribes Tournament, an event hosted by Marseille as the 2013 European Capital of Culture, on 24 June 2013. Québec won the match 21–0. The team currently consists mostly of players from the Première Ligue de soccer du Québec and former Montreal Impact players. They are currently coached by former Canadian international Patrick Leduc.

History

The idea of a Québec national soccer team started as a hypothetical conversation at a birthday party attended by both Patrick Leduc and Yannick Saint-Germain, a former member of the Montreal Impact marketing department and Montreal Director of Operations for the 2007 FIFA U20 World Cup held in Canada. An initial attempt by Saint-Germain to form a national team for Québec in hopes of entering the 2012 VIVA World Cup for non-FIFA teams failed. However, in 2013 a team was organized to enter the 2013 International Peoples, Cultures, and Tribes Tournament held in Marseille, France. For the tournament, the team had a budget of only $40,000 CAD and stayed in college dormitories and took public transportation. This tournament was the first time that a senior team representing Québec had played in an international tournament.  However, Under-14 and Under-16 teams have competed against France and Mexico in the past. After several teams dropped out of the 2013 International Peoples, Cultures, and Tribes Tournament because they were unable to obtain visas, the groups were reorganized and Québec was grouped with hosts Provence and a select side of European-based Tibetan players representing Tibet. Québec played their first-ever match on 24 June 2013 against Tibet and won 21–0. Durnik Jean and Reda Agourram led Québec's offense in the match with four and three goals respectively.  However, because it was not the official Tibet national football team, it was not considered a full international match. Coincidentally, this first match, and victory, occurred on St. John the Baptist Day, the National Holiday of Québec.  On 25 June 2013, Québec played its first official full international against Provence as part of the same tournament and will be entered into the non-FIFA rankings. Québec upset the hosts by scoring three unanswered goals after trailing 0–1. Despite the loss, both Québec and Provence qualified for the next round of the tournament.   At the time of the match, Provence was ranked 21 of 68 Non-FIFA teams. In the semi-final match, Québec was finally defeated 0–1 by the B-squad of Kurdistan in extra time. Therefore, Québec faced off against the team of UGA Ardziv (French local club, playing 8th tier), losers of the other semi-final against Provence, for the bronze medal of the tournament.  On 28 June 2013, Québec defeated the squad of UGA Ardziv by a score of 2–1 after going down a goal early.  Therefore, Québec earned a medal in its inaugural international tournament.

On 9 October 2013, Québec became an official member of the Confederation of Independent Football Associations (ConIFA), a global umbrella organization for national football teams outside FIFA. Other members of the federation include Occitania, Tamil Eelam, and Northern Cyprus. On 23 October 2013, it was announced that Québec would take part in the 2014 ConIFA World Championship to be held from 31 May to 8 July 2014 in Sweden. However, it was announced in May 2014 that Québec withdrew from the ConIFA World Championship after associating with the Québec Soccer Federation. The team and association decided to take part in only "federated" soccer in hopes of one day being recognized as a CONCACAF member.

In June 2015, a Québec squad was assembled for the first time in two years for a match against semi-professional side Vermont Voltage. The match was also the team's first match in Québec, taking place in Saint-Lambert as part of its soccer association's 30th anniversary. Patrick Leduc remained a player-coach for the squad. The match was dubbed the Lake Champlain Derby because of the close proximity both teams had to the lake. Two days before the match was set to be played, it was cancelled, once again, because of the QSF prohibiting the team from playing non-federated matches.

Kit
Since 2013, the Italian sportswear company Mass Sport has been the kit provider for Québec. In 2014 they changed supplier to the local brand Savi. The kit is blue and white with a Fleur-de-lis on the chest, representing the traditional colours and design of the flag of Québec.

List of international matches

2013

2015

(A) = full Non-FIFA "A" International Match

Current squad

This squad was selected for the 2013 International Peoples, Cultures, and Tribes Tournament.

Managers

References

External links
Official website of Les Québécois
Official YouTube
Official Flickr
Official Twitter
Official Facebook
Quebec Soccer Federation Website

CONIFA member associations
North American national and official selection-teams not affiliated to FIFA
Soccer in Quebec
soccer